Gamma Phi Beta has chartered 187 collegiate chapters.

Chapters
{| class="sortable wikitable" style="font-size: 85%; text-align: center; width: auto;"
|-
! Chapter !! College !! Location !! Status
|-
| Alpha || Syracuse University || Syracuse, NY ||
|-
| Beta || University of Michigan || Ann Arbor, MI ||
|-
| Gamma|| University of Wisconsin–Madison || Madison, WI ||
|-
| Delta|| Boston University || Boston, MA ||
|-
| Epsilon|| Northwestern University || Evanston, IL ||
|-
| Zeta|| Goucher College || Towson, MD ||
|-
| Eta|| University of California - Berkeley || Berkeley, CA ||
|-
| Theta|| University of Denver || Denver, CO ||
|-
| Iota|| Columbia University || New York, NY ||
|-
| Kappa|| University of Minnesota - Twin Cities || Minneapolis, MN ||
|-
| Lambda|| University of Washington || Seattle, WA ||
|-
| Mu|| Stanford University || Palo Alto, CA ||
|-
| Nu || University of Oregon || Eugene, OR ||
|-
| Xi|| University of Idaho || Moscow, ID ||
|-
| Omicron|| University of Illinois || Urbana, IL ||
|-
| Pi|| University of Nebraska - Lincoln || Lincoln, NE ||
|-
| Rho|| University of Iowa || Iowa City, IA ||
|-
| Sigma|| University of Kansas || Lawrence, KS ||
|-
| Tau|| Colorado State University || Fort Collins, CO ||
|-
| Upsilon|| Hollins College || Roanoke, VA ||
|-
| Phi|| Washington University in St. Louis || St. Louis, MO ||
|-
| Chi|| Oregon State University || Corvallis, OR ||
|-
| Psi|| University of Oklahoma || Norman, OK ||
|-
| Omega|| Iowa State University || Ames, IA ||
|-
| Alpha Alpha|| University of Toronto || Toronto, ON ||
|-
| Alpha Beta|| University of North Dakota || Grand Forks, ND ||
|-
| Alpha Gamma|| University of Nevada, Reno || Reno, NV ||
|-
| Alpha Delta|| University of Missouri || Columbia, MO ||
|-
| Alpha Epsilon|| University of Arizona || Tucson, AZ ||
|-
| Alpha Zeta|| University of Texas || Austin, TX ||
|-
| Alpha Eta|| Ohio Wesleyan University || Delaware, OH ||
|-
| Alpha Theta|| Vanderbilt University || Nashville, TN ||
|-
| Alpha Iota|| University of California, Los Angeles || Los Angeles, CA ||
|-
| Alpha Kappa|| University of Manitoba || Winnipeg, MB ||
|-
| Alpha Lambda|| University of British Columbia || Vancouver, BC ||
|-
| Alpha Mu|| Rollins College || Winter Park, FL ||
|-
| Alpha Nu|| Wittenberg University || Springfield, OH ||
|-
| Alpha Xi|| Southern Methodist University || Dallas, TX ||
|-
| Alpha Omicron|| North Dakota State University || Fargo, ND ||
|-
| Alpha Pi|| West Virginia University || Morgantown, WV ||
|-
| Alpha Rho|| Birmingham-Southern College || Birmingham, AL ||
|-
| Alpha Sigma|| Randolph-Macon Women's College || Lynchburg, VA ||
|-
| Alpha Tau|| McGill University || Montreal, QC ||
|-
| Alpha Upsilon|| Pennsylvania State University || State College, PA ||
|-
| Alpha Phi|| Colorado College || Colorado Springs, CO ||
|-
| Alpha Chi|| College of William & Mary || Williamsburg, VA ||
|-
| Alpha Psi|| Lake Forest College || Lake Forest, IL ||
|-
| Alpha Omega|| University of Western Ontario || London, ON ||
|-
|Beta Alpha|| University of Southern California || Los Angeles, CA ||
|-
| Beta Beta|| University of Maryland || College Park, MD ||
|-
| Beta Gamma|| Bowling Green State University || Bowling Green, OH ||
|-
| Beta Delta|| Michigan State University || East Lansing, MI ||
|-
| Beta Epsilon|| Miami University || Oxford, OH ||
|-
| Beta Zeta|| Kent State University || Kent, OH ||
|-
| Beta Eta|| Bradley University || Peoria, IL ||
|-
| Beta Theta|| San Jose State University || San Jose, CA ||
|-
| Beta Iota|| Idaho State College || Pocatello, ID ||
|-
| Beta Kappa|| Arizona State University || Tempe, AZ ||
|-
| Beta Lambda|| San Diego State University || San Diego, CA ||
|-
| Beta Mu|| Florida State University || Tallahassee, FL ||
|-
| Beta Nu|| University of Vermont || Burlington, VT ||
|-
| Beta Xi|| Ohio State University || Columbus, OH ||
|-
| Beta Omicron|| Oklahoma City University || Oklahoma City, OK ||
|-
| Beta Pi|| Indiana State University || Terre Haute, IN ||
|-
| Beta Rho|| University of Colorado, Boulder || Boulder, CO ||
|-
| Beta Sigma|| Washington State University || Pullman, WA ||
|-
| Beta Tau|| Texas Tech University || Lubbock, TX ||
|-
| Beta Upsilon|| Kansas State University || Manhattan, KS ||
|-
| Beta Phi|| Indiana University || Bloomington, IN ||
|-
| Beta Chi|| Wichita State University || Wichita, KS ||
|-
| Beta Psi|| Oklahoma State University || Stillwater, OK ||
|-
| Beta Omega|| Northern Arizona University || Flagstaff, AZ ||
|-
| Gamma Alpha|| Memphis State University || Memphis, TN ||
|-
| Gamma Beta|| Gettysburg College || Gettysburg, PA ||
|-
| Gamma Gamma|| University of Wisconsin–Milwaukee || Milwaukee, WI ||
|-
| Gamma Delta|| University of Wyoming || Laramie, WY ||
|-
| Gamma Epsilon|| University of Puget Sound || Tacoma, WA ||
|-
| Gamma Zeta|| Texas A&M University–Commerce || Commerce, TX ||
|-
| Gamma Eta|| California State University, Long Beach || Long Beach, CA ||
|-
| Gamma Theta|| University of the Pacific || Stockton, CA ||
|-
| Gamma Iota|| Midwestern State University || Wichita Falls, TX ||
|-
| Gamma Kappa|| University of Nebraska at Kearney || Kearney, NE ||
|-
| Gamma Lambda|| Louisiana State University || Baton Rouge, LA ||
|-
| Gamma Mu|| Moorhead State University || Moorhead, MN ||
|-
| Gamma Nu|| Lamar University || Beaumont, TX ||
|-
| Gamma Xi|| University of Tennessee || Knoxville, TN ||
|-
| Gamma Omicron|| University of Kentucky || Lexington, KY ||
|-
| Gamma Pi|| Minnesota State University, Mankato || Mankato, MN ||
|-
| Gamma Rho|| University of Wisconsin–Oshkosh || Oshkosh, WI ||
|-
| Gamma Sigma|| Western Michigan University || Kalamazoo, MI ||
|-
| Gamma Tau|| St. Louis University || St. Louis, MO ||
|-
| Gamma Upsilon|| Drake University || Des Moines, IA ||
|-
| Gamma Phi|| Auburn University || Auburn, AL ||
|-
| Gamma Chi|| Texas State University || San Marcos, TX ||
|-
| Gamma Psi|| University of Northern Iowa || Cedar Falls, IA ||
|-
| Gamma Omega|| University of Wisconsin–Platteville || Platteville, WI ||
|-
| Delta Alpha|| University of Wisconsin–River Falls || River Falls, WI ||
|-
| Delta Beta|| Boise State University || Boise, ID ||
|-
| Delta Gamma|| University of Nebraska, Omaha || Omaha, NE ||
|-
| Delta Delta|| California State University, Fullerton || Fullerton, CA ||
|-
| Delta Epsilon|| Texas Wesleyan University || Fort Worth, TX ||
|-
| Delta Eta|| University of California, Irvine || Irvine, CA ||
|-
| Delta Zeta|| Southwestern Oklahoma State University || Sayre, OK ||
|-
| Delta Theta|| California Polytechnic State University || San Luis Obispo, CA ||
|-
| Delta Iota|| Purdue University || West Lafayette, IN ||
|-
| Delta Kappa|| Lehigh University || Bethlehem, PA ||
|-
| Delta Lambda|| University of California, Riverside || Riverside, CA ||
|-
| Delta Mu|| Rutgers University || New Brunswick, NJ ||
|-
| Delta Nu|| Missouri State University || Springfield, MO ||
|-
| Delta Xi|| Bucknell University || Lewisburg, PA ||
|-
| Delta Omicron|| Southern Polytechnic State University || Marietta, GA ||
|-
| Delta Pi|| Illinois State University || Normal, IL ||
|-
| Delta Rho|| Dickinson College || Carlisle, PA ||
|-
| Delta Sigma|| Florida Institute of Technology || Melbourne, FL ||
|-
| Delta Tau|| Colgate University || Hamilton, NY ||
|-
| Delta Upsilon|| University of Georgia || Athens, GA ||
|-
| Delta Phi|| California State University, Bakersfield || Bakersfield, CA ||
|-
| Delta Chi|| California State University, Sacramento || Sacramento, CA ||
|-
| Delta Psi|| University of California, Santa Barbara || Santa Barbara, CA ||
|-
| Delta Omega|| Oakland University || Rochester, MI ||
|-
| Epsilon Alpha|| La Salle University || Philadelphia, PA ||
|-
| Epsilon Beta|| Alma College || Alma, MI ||
|-
| Epsilon Gamma|| University of San Diego || San Diego, CA ||
|-
| Epsilon Delta|| Creighton University || Omaha, NE ||
|-
| Epsilon Epsilon|| Union College || Schenectady, NY ||
|-
| Epsilon Zeta|| Jacksonville University || Jacksonville, FL ||
|-
| Epsilon Eta|| Bridgewater State University || Bridgewater, MA ||
|-
| Epsilon Theta|| Clemson University || Clemson, SC ||
|-
| Epsilon Iota|| Christopher Newport University || Newport News, VA ||
|-
| Epsilon Kappa|| California State University, Chico || Chico, CA ||
|-
| Epsilon Lambda|| University of Alabama || Tuscaloosa, AL ||
|-
| Epsilon Mu|| Loyola University New Orleans|| New Orleans, LA ||
|-
| Epsilon Nu|| Chapman University || Orange, CA ||
|-
| Epsilon Xi|| Rhodes College || Memphis, TN ||
|-
| Epsilon Omicron|| University of California, Santa Cruz || Santa Cruz, CA ||
|-
| Epsilon Pi|| George Mason University || Fairfax, VA ||
|-
| Epsilon Rho|| Stephen F. Austin State University || Nacogdoches, TX ||
|-
| Epsilon Sigma|| Morehead State University || Morehead, KY ||
|-
| Epsilon Tau|| University of Rochester || Rochester, NY ||
|-
| Epsilon Upsilon|| University of South Dakota || Vermillion, SD ||
|-
| Epsilon Phi|| Bentley University || Waltham, MA ||
|-
| Epsilon Chi|| Marquette University || Milwaukee, WI ||
|-
| Epsilon Psi|| University of North Carolina, Asheville || Asheville, NC ||
|-
| Epsilon Omega|| University of Miami || Miami, FL ||
|-
| Zeta Alpha|| Eastern Washington University || Cheney, WA ||
|-
| Zeta Beta|| University of Virginia || Charlottesville, VA ||
|-
| Zeta Gamma|| Sonoma State University || Rohnert Park, CA ||
|-
| Zeta Delta|| Southeast Missouri State University || Cape Girardeau, MO ||
|-
| Zeta Epsilon|| Duquesne University || Pittsburgh, PA ||
|-
| Zeta Zeta|| Coastal Carolina University || Conway, SC ||
|-
| Zeta Eta|| Lander University || Greenwood, SC ||
|-
| Zeta Theta|| Pepperdine University || Malibu, CA ||
|-
| Zeta Iota|| Valparaiso University || Valparaiso, IN ||
|-
| Zeta Kappa|| University of Southern Indiana || Evansville, IN ||
|-
| Zeta Lambda|| Texas A&M University–Corpus Christi || Corpus Christi, TX ||
|-
| Zeta Mu|| St. John's University (New York) || Queens, NY ||
|-
| Zeta Nu|| University of Detroit Mercy || Detroit, MI ||
|-
| Zeta Xi|| Albertson College of Idaho || Caldwell, ID ||
|-
| Zeta Omicron|| John Carroll University || University Heights, OH ||
|-
| Zeta Pi|| Penn State Altoona || Altoona, PA ||
|-
| Zeta Rho|| Texas A&M University || College Station, TX ||
|-
| Zeta Sigma|| University of South Carolina || Columbia, SC ||
|-
| Zeta Tau|| Emory University || Atlanta, GA ||
|-
| Zeta Upsilon|| University of Texas at Tyler || Tyler, TX ||
|-
| Zeta Phi|| University of Arkansas – Fort Smith || Fort Smith, AR ||
|-
| Zeta Chi|| Texas Christian University || Fort Worth, TX ||
|-
| Zeta Psi|| University of Texas, San Antonio || San Antonio, TX ||
|-
| Zeta Omega|| Kennesaw State University || Kennesaw, GA ||
|-
| Eta Alpha|| Lake Erie College || Painesville, OH ||
|-
| Eta Beta|| Florida Southern College || Lakeland, FL ||
|-
| Eta Gamma|| University of Delaware || Newark, DE ||
|-
| Eta Delta|| Grand Valley State University || Allendale, MI ||
|-
| Eta Epsilon|| Virginia Tech || Blacksburg, VA ||
|- 
| Eta Zeta|| University of Cincinnati || Cincinnati, OH ||
|- 
| Eta Theta|| University of Connecticut || Storrs, CT ||
|- 
| Eta Eta|| University of South Florida || Tampa, FL ||
|-
| Eta Iota|| Rockhurst University || Kansas City, MO ||
|-
| Eta Kappa|| University of Tennessee, Chattanooga || Chattanooga, TN ||
|-
| Eta Lambda|| University of Central Florida || Orlando, FL ||
|-
| Eta Mu|| Duke University || Durham, NC ||
|-
| Eta Nu|| James Madison University || Harrisonburg, VA ||
|-
| Eta Xi|| University of Florida || Gainesville, FL ||
|-
| Eta Omicron|| Ohio University || Athens, Ohio ||
|-
| Eta Pi || Quinnipiac University || Hamden, CT || 
|-
| Eta Rho|| University of Nevada Las Vegas || Las Vegas, NV ||
|-
| Eta Sigma || University of Central Missouri || Warrensburg, MO || 
|-
| Eta Tau || Colorado Mesa University || Grand Junction, CO || 
|-
| Eta Upsilon ||Nicholls State University|| Thibodaux, LA ||
|-
| Eta Phi ||Virginia Commonwealth University|| Richmond, VA ||
|-
| Eta Chi ||California State University San Marcos|| San Marcos, CA ||
|-

Lists of chapters of United States student societies by society
chapters